The Sanctuary of Saint Michael the Archangel is a Roman Catholic shrine on Mount Gargano, Italy, part of the commune of Monte Sant'Angelo, in the province of Foggia, northern Apulia. It has the dignity of a minor basilica.

It is the oldest shrine in Western Europe dedicated to the Archangel Michael and has been an important site of pilgrimage since the early Middle Ages. The historic site and its environs are protected by the Parco Nazionale del Gargano.

In 2011, it became a UNESCO World Heritage Site as part of a group of seven inscribed as Longobards in Italy: Places of Power (568-774 A.D.).

Legendary history
The earliest account of the foundation of the Sanctuary is a composite Latin hagiographical text known as Liber de apparitione Sancti Michaelis in Monte Gargano (Bibliotheca Hagiographica Latina 5948).

There are three sections to the legend, recording three apparitions of Michael: the first and third sections appear to be part of the same narrative, while the second is possibly the account of a battle half a century later. According to the first and last parts of the legend, around the year 490 the Archangel Michael appeared several times to the Bishop of Sipontum near a cave in the mountains, instructing that the cave be dedicated to Christian worship and promising protection of the nearby town of Sipontum from pagan invaders. These apparitions are also the first appearances of Saint Michael in western Europe.

The second section of the text describes Michael's intercession on behalf of the Sipontans and the Beneventans against invading pagan Neapolitans. On the eve of the battle, Michael appeared with flaming sword atop the mountain; the Sipontans and Beneventans were victorious. Giorgio Otranto identifies this battle as the one recorded in Book 4 of Paul the Deacon's History of the Lombards, which describes the defense of Mount Gargano against unidentified 'Greeks' – possibly Byzantine Greeks – by the Lombard Duke of Benevento, Grimoald I, on 8 May 663.

In commemoration of this victory, the church of Sipontum instituted a special feast on May 8 honoring the Archangel, which then spread throughout the Western Christendom during the 9th century. Since the time of Pius V it has been formalized as Apparitio Sancti Michaelis, although it originally did not commemorate the apparition but the victory of the Lombards over invading Greeks.

Pope Gelasius I (reigned 492–496) directed that a basilica should be erected enclosing the space. The Basilica di San Giovanni in Tumba is the final resting-place of the Lombard King Rothari (died 652); the designation "tumba" is now applied to the cupola on squinches.

History

After the Gothic War (535-554), Byzantium lacked the power to maintain its holdings in Italy and the Lombards successfully conquered southern Italy by the end of the 6th century. Grimoald I controlled the area as Duke of Benevento from 647 to 662; when he became King of the Lombards in 662 he passed on the region to his son, Romuald I, who renovated the sanctuary and encouraged its use as a pilgrimage site.

Architecture

The complex of buildings consists of the Battistero di San Giovanni in Tumba, damaged in 1942, and the Church of Santa Maria Maggiore. The baptistery presents a rectangular storey on which rests an octagon supporting an elliptical section and a high drum that supports the cupola. The church erected in the eleventh century by Archbishop Leone stands upon the remains of an ancient necropolis. A few remnants attest to its once-rich fresco decoration.

The Castello was enlarged by the Normans upon an episcopal residence of Orso, Bishop of Benevento, to provide a suitable seat for the Honor Montis Sancti Angeli, further modified by Frederick II. The massive, octagonal campanile was built in the late 13th century by Frederick II as a watchtower. It was turned into a bell tower by Charles I of Anjou.

Behind a forecourt the sanctuary presents a portico of two Gothic arches, the right one of 1395 by the local architect Simone, the left one a reconstruction of 1865. From the portico steps lead down to the low arched nave. The cavern can be accessed from a Romanesque portal, called the Portale del Toro ("Gate of the Bull"): the doors, in bronze, were made in Constantinople in 1076, the donation of an Amalfitan noble. They are divided into 24 panels portraying episodes of angels from the Old and New Testaments.

The archaic cavern opening to the left, with its holy well, is full of votive offerings, especially the 12th century marble bishop's throne supported on crouching lions. Among the ex voto objects is a statue of the Archangel by Andrea Sansovino.

Pilgrimages
Monte Sant'Angelo was a popular pilgrimage site on the way to Jerusalem; pilgrims travelled from as far as Ireland to visit the “Celestial Basilica”. Among the pilgrims who visited the Saint Michael Archangel Sanctuary were many popes (Gelasius I, Leo IX, Urban II, Alexander III, Gregory X, Celestine V, John XXIII as Cardinal, John Paul II), saints (Bridget of Sweden, Bernard of Clairvaux, Thomas Aquinas), emperors, kings, and princes (Louis II of Italy, Otto III, Henry II, Matilda of Tuscany, Charles I of Naples, Ferdinand II of Aragon).

Francis of Assisi also visited the Sanctuary, but, feeling unworthy to enter the grotto, stopped in prayer and meditation at the entrance, kissed a stone, and carved on it the sign of the cross in the form “T” (tau).

The guardians
Since 13 July 1996, the pastoral care of Saint Michael Archangel Sanctuary has been given to the Congregation of Saint Michael the Archangel.

See also
 Saint Michael in the Catholic Church
 Chaplet of Saint Michael the Archangel
 Scapular of Saint Michael the Archangel

References
 Arnold, J.C. "Arcadia Becomes Jerusalem: Angelic Caverns and Shrine Conversion at Monte Gargano." Speculum vol. 75 (July 2000), pp. 567–88
 N. Everett, "The Liber de apparitione S. Michaelis in Monte Gargano and the hagiography of dispossession", Analecta Bollandiana 120 (2002), 364–391. (Argues that the Liber reflects conflict between the churches of Siponto and Benevento over control of the Gargano shrine, and that the Liber dates c.663-750).
 Nicholas Everett, Patron Saints of Early Medieval Italy AD 350-800 (PIMS / Durham University Press, 2016), pp. 73–83 (Eng. trans of Liber and commentary).
 Piccardi L., "Paleoseismic evidence of legendary earthquakes: the apparition of Archangel Michael at Monte Sant’Angelo (Italy)." Tectonophysics vol. 408 (2005), 113–128.

Notes

External links

 Sanctuary of Saint Michael the Archangel – Official website
 Pilgrims at San Michele in Gargano in Catholics & Cultures
 Jacopus de Voragine, Golden Legend: Saint Michael
 Selected modern bibliography
 Virtual tour of the Sanctuary
 Monte Sant’Angelo & the Gargano Photos

World Heritage Sites in Italy
Roman Catholic shrines
Michael (archangel)
Peaks dedicated to Michael (archangel)
Lombard architecture
Churches in the province of Foggia
Tourist attractions in Apulia
12th-century Roman Catholic church buildings in Italy
San Giovanni Rotondo